In mathematics, the Weierstrass product inequality states that for any real numbers 0 ≤ a1, ..., an ≤ 1 we have

where 

The inequality is named after the German mathematician Karl Weierstrass. It can be proven easily via mathematical induction.

References

 
Inequalities